The Rabbit Ears are a pair of mountain peaks in northeastern New Mexico, United States,  north of the city of Clayton.  The two peaks were a distinctive landmark along the Cimarron Cutoff of the Santa Fe Trail, a major route for westbound settlers in the 19th century.  The formation was designated a  National Historic Landmark in 1963.The name is that of a Native American chief who was killed here in a battle with the Spanish in 1717. 

Description
The Rabbit Ears are part of a formation known as the Clayton Complex, an area of elevated terrain north of Clayton and south of the New Mexico-Colorado state line.  Its principal features are two peaks that are a regular presence on the landscape, especially when approached from the east. They are called Rabbit Ears Mountain and Mount Clayton, although the latter has also been historically called the Round Mound.  Rabbit Ears Mountain, which has two peaks, is located directly north of Clayton, and is skirted to the south and west by New Mexico State Road 370.  Mount Clayton lies to its west, south of the junction of U.S. Route 85 and New Mexico State Road 453.  The Clayton Complex itself forms part of the Raton-Clayton volcanic field; Rabbit Ears are the only part of that field visible from Texas.

The Cimarron Cutoff of the Santa Fe Trail was one of two major branches of the Santa Fe Trail, a major 19th-century settlement route connecting Kansas City, Missouri and Santa Fe, New Mexico.  Its route branched from the Mountain Route near Fort Dodge, roughly following the watershed of the Cimarron River into what is now northeastern New Mexico, where it then went southwesterly toward Santa Fe.  The eastern portion of the route is roughly covered by present-day United States Route 56 and United States Route 412.

As a consequence, there are three areas that were regularly used as camp sites by westbound travelers near the two mountains. McNees Crossing on Corrumpa Creek (or McNees Creek), Turkey Creek Camp on what is now called Alamos Creek, and Rabbit Ears Camp on Cienequilla Creek. Each of these creeks ran reliably in the spring, and continued to provide water even after they stopped running fully. Camps would be located along their banks, their exact locations varying based on water availability. Remnant trail ruts are visible in each of these areas.

The Rabbit Ears formation figures prominently in Louis L'Amour's novel Mustang Man.

See also

 Capulin Volcano National Monument
 Clayton, New Mexico
 National Register of Historic Places listings in Union County, New Mexico
 List of National Historic Landmarks in New Mexico

References

External links
 
 Photo of Rabbit Ears Mountain

National Historic Landmarks in New Mexico
Geography of Union County, New Mexico
Natural features on the National Register of Historic Places in New Mexico
Historic districts on the National Register of Historic Places in New Mexico
National Register of Historic Places in Union County, New Mexico
Archaeological sites on the National Register of Historic Places in New Mexico
Santa Fe Trail